John Casey (12 May 1820, Kilbehenny, County Limerick, Ireland – 3 January 1891, Dublin) was a respected Irish geometer. He is most famous for Casey's theorem on a circle that is tangent to four other circles, an extension of Ptolemy's theorem. However, he contributed several novel proofs and perspectives on Euclidean geometry. He and Émile Lemoine are considered to be the co-founders of the modern geometry of the circle and the triangle.

Biography
He was born at Kilbehenny in Limerick, Ireland and educated locally at Mitchelstown, before becoming a teacher under the Board of National Education. He later became headmaster of the Central Model Schools in Kilkenny City. He subsequently entered Trinity College Dublin in 1858, where he was elected a Scholar in 1861 and was awarded the degree of BA in 1862. He was then Mathematics Master at Kingston School (1862–1873), Professor of Higher Mathematics and Mathematical Physics at the newly founded Catholic University of Ireland (1873–1881) and Lecturer in Mathematics at its successor, the University College Dublin (1881–1891).

Honours and awards
In 1869, the University of Dublin awarded Casey the Honorary Degree of Doctor of Laws. He was elected a Fellow of the Royal Society in June 1875. He was elected to the Royal Irish Academy and in 1880 became a member of its council. In 1878 the Academy conferred upon him the much coveted Cunningham Gold Medal. His work was also acknowledged by the Norwegian Government, among others. He was elected a member of the Societe Mathematique de France in 1884 and received the honorary degree of Doctor of Laws from the Royal University of Ireland in 1885.

Major works
 1880: On Cubic Transformations
 1881: On Cyclides and Sphero-quartics, from Internet Archive
 1882: The First Six Books of the Elements of Euclid, link from Project Gutenberg
 1885: A Treatise on the Analytic Geometry of the Point, Line, Circle and Conic Sections, Second edition, 1893, links from Internet Archive
 1886 A Sequel to the First Six Books of Euclid, 4th edition, link from Internet Archive
 1886: A Treatise on Elementary Trigonometry (Dublin, 1886)
 1888: A Treatise on Plane Trigonometry containing an account of the Hyperbolic Functions
 1889: [https://archive.org/details/atreatiseonsphe00casegoog A Treatise on Spherical Geometry], link from Internet Archive

References

Sources
 Irish Monthly (1891), XIX, 106, 152
 Proc. Royal Society'' (1891), XLIX, 30, p. xxiv.

Further reading

 1913 Catholic Encyclopedia article on John Casey
 "James Maher, Chief of the Comeraghs, Mullinahone, 1957, pp 295–299.
 MacTutor History of Mathematics

External links
 
 

1820 births
1891 deaths
Fellows of the Royal Society
Geometers
Irish mathematicians
People from County Kilkenny
Scholars of Trinity College Dublin
19th-century British mathematicians
19th-century Irish people
Members of the Royal Irish Academy